The Wongalee Falls, a waterfall on the Freshwater Creek, is located in the UNESCO World Heritagelisted Wet Tropics in the Far North region of Queensland, Australia.

The falls are a part of the Crystal Cascades found near the head of the, downstream from Milmilgee Falls, northwest of Cairns near Redlynch.

See also

 List of waterfalls of Queensland

References 

Waterfalls of Far North Queensland